Dowler is a surname. Notable people with the surname include:

Annabelle Dowler (born 1974), English actress
Arthur Dowler KCB KBE (1895–1963), General Officer Commanding the East Africa Command of the British Army
Beau Dowler (born 1987), former Australian rules footballer
Boyd Dowler (born 1937), former professional football player, a wide receiver in the National Football League
Brendan Dowler, OAM (born 1968), Australian wheelchair basketball player
Jean Dowler (1926–1992), female Baseball catcher and pitcher
Joseph Dowler (1879–1931), British tug of war competitor
Lawrence Dowler (born 1954), American former competition swimmer
Maxine Crouse Dowler, teacher, administrator, director
Mike Dowler, retired Welsh professional football goalkeeper
Milly Dowler, 13-year-old English girl who was abducted in Walton-on-Thames, Surrey in 2002 and subsequently murdered
Thomas Dowler (1903–1986), American football, basketball, and baseball player and coach of football and basketball
William Dowler Morris (1857–1931), mayor of Ottawa, Canada in 1901

See also
Charles Dowler House, historic house at 581 Smith Street in Providence, Rhode Island
W Dowler & Sons founded 1744 in Birmingham, a manufacturer of numerous goods, notably buttons, Vesta matches, hand bells, letter balances, swords, corkscrews and whistles
Dower
Owler